The Poonch River (also known as Punch River, Punch Tohi, Tohi of Punch) is a tributary of the Jhelum River that flows through Jammu and Kashmir in India, and Azad Jammu and Kashmir in Pakistan.

Name 
According to Georg Bühler, the ancient form of the word Tohi is Taushi mentioned in the Rājataraṅgiṇī and the Nīlamata Purāṇa. In the latter work, Āpagā (Aik Nala of Sialkot), Tauśī and Candrabhāgā are named together. Probably, the word is connected with the Sanskrit tuṣāra, 'cold', i.e. 'snow'.

Course 
The river originates in the south-facing foothills of Pir Panjal range, in the areas of Neel-Kanth Gali and Jamian Gali. It is called 'Siran' (Suran) in this area. It flows south and then west until it reaches the town of Poonch, after which it bends southwest, finally draining into the Mangla Reservoir near Chomukh. The towns of Poonch, Sehra, Tatta Pani, Kotli and Mirpur are situated on the banks of this river.

Tributaries 
Frederic Drew wrote of the Poonch river in 1875:

The prominent tributaries of the river are:

 Mandi,
 Nimbal Katha,
 Darungli, 
 Betaar,
 Ranguri,
 Rangar,
 Menthar,
 Nail,
 Baan,
 Mahuli, and
 Khad.

The Betaar Nala, which originates in the Azad Kashmir's Haveli District and flows southwest to join the Poonch river near the Poonch town, is sometimes called the 'Punch River'. (The upstream part of Poonch river is then called the Suran river.)

Environment 
The Mughal Road from Shopian circles around the origin of the Poonch River and runs along its banks.

The Parnai hydropower project, under construction near Bafliaz in India's Poonch district, is expected to generate 37.5 Mega Watt power and also irrigate vast tracts of agricultural land in the district. The project was set for completion in 2017–18 but is delayed.

The 100 MW Gulpur Hydropower Project is located on this river in Azad Jammu and Kashmir.

Notes

References

External links 
 Poonch River marked on OpenStreetMap, retrieved 19 January 2021.

Rivers of Azad Kashmir
Rivers of Jammu and Kashmir
Poonch District, Pakistan
Rivers of Pakistan
Rivers of India